Big Branch is a  long 2nd order tributary to Lanes Creek in Anson County, North Carolina.

Course
Big Branch rises about 2 miles southeast of Fountain Hill, North Carolina.  Big Branch then flows southeast to meet Lanes Creek about 2 miles north of Griffins Crossroads.

Watershed
Big Branch drains  of area, receives about 48.0 in/year of precipitation, has a topographic wetness index of 420.54 and is about 60% forested.

References

Rivers of North Carolina
Rivers of Anson County, North Carolina
Tributaries of the Pee Dee River